The SS Chesapeake is a transport oiler that was in service with the United States Navy from 2000 to 2009. She was operated by Military Sealift Command.

Construction and commercial service 1964–1987

SS Chesapeake was built by the Bethlehem Steel Sparrows Point Yard at Baltimore, Maryland, and delivered to the Hess Shipping Company on 29 October 1964. She entered commercial service with the company as the tanker SS Hess Voyager. She was renamed SS Chesapeake on 22 July 1980. She is a near exact twin to her sister ship SS Petersburg.

Ready Reserve Force 1987–2000

The U.S. Maritime Administration relieved Hess Shipping of Chesapeake under an exchange program on 15 December 1987. Chesapeake was then laid up in the Maritime Administrations Ready Reserve Fleet until 2000.

Military Sealift Command Service 2000–2009

Chesapeake was activated for service in the Military Sealift Command in 2000 as a transport oiler. Interocean Ugland Management Corporation of Voorhees, New Jersey, operates her with a civilian crew under contract to Military Sealift Command as a Common User Tanker as SS Chesapeake (AOT-5084).

Chesapeake was removed from service in 2009 and was scrapped on 19 April 2021 at Brownsville.

Gallery

References
 FM 10-67-1 CONCEPTS AND EQUIPMENT OF PETROLEUM OPERATIONS
 NavSource Online: Service Ship Photo Archive: SS Chesapeake (AOT-5084)

External links

Historic American Engineering Record in Texas
Tankers of the United States
Ships built in Sparrows Point, Maryland
1964 ships
Chesapeake-class transport oilers
Oilers